Cleveland-Cliffs Inc., formerly Cliffs Natural Resources, is a Cleveland, Ohio-based company that specializes in the mining, beneficiation, and pelletizing of iron ore, as well as steelmaking, including stamping and tooling. It is the largest flat-rolled steel producer in North America.

Operations
Cleveland-Cliffs manages and operates four iron ore mines in Minnesota and two mines in Michigan, one of which, the Empire Mine, has been indefinitely idled. These mines produce various grades of iron ore pellets, including standard and fluxed, for use in blast furnaces as part of the steelmaking process as well as Direct Reduced (DR) grade pellets for use in Direct Reduced Iron (DRI) applications. Since the mines are located near the Great Lakes, the majority of the pellets are transported by rail to loading ports for shipments via vessel to steelmakers in North America. During 2020, 2019 and 2018, the company sold 12 million, 19 million and 21 million long tons of iron ore product, respectively, to third parties.

The company operates a Hot-Briquetted Iron (HBI) facility in Toledo, Ohio.  HBI is a form of DRI that can be used as an alternative to scrap iron. When used as a feedstock, HBI can enable an electric arc furnace to produce more valuable grades of steel.

It also operates three cokemaking facilities in Monessen, Pennsylvania, Warren, Ohio, and Follansbee, West Virginia, with an annual capacity of  3.9 million tons, as well as a coal mine in Princeton, West Virginia.

The company operates many fully-integrated steel mills and finishing facilities  in Kentucky, Indiana, Illinois, Ohio, Michigan, Pennsylvania, West Virginia, and North Carolina. It has annual production capacity of approximately 23 million net tons of raw steel.

History

19th century 
The firm's earliest predecessor was the Cleveland Iron Mining Company, founded in 1847 and chartered as a company by Michigan in 1850. Samuel Mather and six Ohio-based associates had learned of rich iron-ore deposits recently discovered in the highlands of the Upper Peninsula of Michigan. Soon afterwards, the first Soo Locks opened in 1855, allowing iron ore to be shipped from Lake Superior to Lake Erie.

Technological improvements, such as the Bessemer process, made it possible for the North American Great Lakes to produce steel on an industrial scale. The south shore of Lake Erie was near a supply of coal, making that region an efficient point for the construction of steel mills.

The company's request for government intervention quashed the Upper Peninsula miners' strike of 1865.

In the late 1800s, the company expanded via acquisitions to gain market share. The former Cleveland Iron Mining Co. was a survivor of this shakeout, purchasing many of its competitors. One key merger in 1890, with Jeptha Wade's Cliffs Iron Company led the combined firm to change its name to the Cleveland-Cliffs Iron Company.

The company invested substantially to improve the logistics of iron-ore transport. In 1892, the firm built the Lake Superior and Ishpeming Railroad to carry iron ore from the mines directly to company-owned docks on Lake Superior.

20th century 
William G. Mather, the son of Samuel, guided Cleveland-Cliffs as president and later as chairman of the board from 1890 to 1947, participating in the transition from the hard-rock iron ore of Upper Michigan to the soft hematite of Minnesota's Mesabi Range and adjacent lodes.

Under Mather, Cleveland-Cliffs was a leader in the development of the classic-type lake freighter, a bulk-cargo vessel especially designed to carry Great Lakes commodities. The  SS William G. Mather, launched in 1925, is a surviving example of this ship type. For almost a century, the black-hulled Cleveland-Cliffs ships were familiar sights on the upper lakes.

Demand for American iron ore hit peaks during World War I, World War II, and the post-World War II consumer boom. In 1933, Edward Greene (the son-in-law of Jeptha Homer Wade II) replaced William G. Mather as the head of the company. The Mather A Mine opened in the early 1940s and the Mather B shaft in the 1950s. As the Cold War continued, reserves of mineable hematite dwindled in northern Minnesota and Cleveland-Cliffs returned some of its focus to its traditional areas of interest around the Marquette Iron Range, where new deposits of magnetite were opened. The first pellet plant was built at Eagle Mills in 1954, followed by the first grate/kiln plant at the Humboldt Mine in 1960. The Republic Mine was converted from a shaft mine to an open pit and concentrator in 1956 and a two-kiln pellet plant was added in 1962. The Empire Mine opened in 1963 and was expanded in the mid- and late-1970s; the Pioneer Pellet Plant was opened in 1965 to pelletize the underground ore from the Mather B Mine in Negaunee, Michigan. In 1974, the Tilden Mine opened in Ishpeming, Michigan. This mine was and is the only mine in the world with the ability to produce both hematite and magnetite pellets.

In 1970, a high-grade iron-ore mine was opened at Pannawonica in the Pilbara region of Western Australia, with a  rail line to processing facilities at Cape Lambert for which the residential township of Wickham was built. A pellet plant was built but ceased operation before 1980, following a sharp increase in the cost of diesel fuel.

During the 1970s, Cleveland-Cliffs had large interests in uranium and shale oil fields, as well as the oil and gas drilling industries. It also had holdings in the forest products industry. This interests were sold in the 1980s when the company refocused its efforts on its core iron ore business.

After the recessions of 1974–1975 and 1981–1983, Cleveland-Cliffs shrank its operations, closing the Mather B Mine and the Pioneer Pellet Plant and associated Ore Improvement Plant in 1979. The Humboldt Pellet Plant closed in 1981 and the Republic Mine was idled in 1981 and closed for good in 1996, when Cliffs began turning the associated tailings ponds into compensatory wetlands for its other properties. Over half of the Marquette Iron Range employees were laid off and, in 1984, Cliffs withdrew from the Great Lakes shipping industry.

In 1994, the company acquired Northshore Mining in Silver Bay, Minnesota.

21st century 
In 2001, the company cut its dividend by 73% due to low prices. In 2002, Ling-Temco-Vought, a partner in the Empire Mine managed by CCI, closed and the Empire Mine was idled for six months. President George W. Bush enacted the 2002 United States steel tariff that greatly benefitted domestically-produced steel. Benefitting from the tariff, the company embarked upon a strategy to expand globally and to diversify into other minerals, leading to the acquisitions of iron-ore properties in Brazil, Canada and Australia and coal properties in Australia and the US. In 2003, the company, in a joint venture with Laiwu Steel, purchased the assets of bankrupt Eveleth Mines and formed United Taconite. In 2008, it acquired the full ownership for $100 million in cash and 1,529,619 common shares.

In June 2007, the company acquired PinnOak, its first domestic coal company, which mined coal in Alabama and West Virginia and once belonged to U.S. Steel. Due to its venture into coal, the company changed its name from Cleveland-Cliffs to Cliffs Natural Resources in October 2008. In 2008, the company agreed to acquire Alpha Natural Resources but called off the transaction in November 2008 due to the financial crisis of 2007–2008. It paid a $70 million breakup fee. In January 2010, the company acquired Freewest Resources Canada, giving it large chromite deposits in the Ring of Fire district in the James Bay Lowlands of Ontario, Canada, for $550 million. In 2015, it sold those assets for $20 million. In May 2011, the company acquired Consolidated Thompson Iron Mines from Wuhan Iron and Steel Corporation for C$4.9 billion. The acquisition included Bloom Lake iron ore mine in Quebec. On May 5, 2011, the company was added to the Fortune 500. Its ranking of 477 was based on the company's performance in 2010.

in July 2013, CEO Joseph Carrabba announced that he would retire by December 31, 2013. Lead director James Kirsch was elected non-executive chairperson in his stead. Gary Halverson, formerly interim chief operating officer of Barrick Gold, was appointed president and chief operating officer in October 2013, and president and chief executive officer in February 2014. At the 2014 annual general meeting, six new directors nominated by activist hedge fund Casablanca Capital were elected, giving the fund control of the board of directors. Lourenco Goncalves was appointed chairman, president and CEO of the company. The reconstituted Board moved to shift the company's strategic objectives from global diversification to a renewed focus on strengthening its U.S. iron ore business.

In December 2015, the company sold its remaining North American coal operations. Cliffs announced plans in early 2016 to close the Empire Mine near Marquette, Michigan, terminating the jobs of approximately 400 workers. The company announced on August 15, 2017 that it was returning to its former brand name, Cleveland-Cliffs Inc. In August 2018, the company sold its Asia Pacific iron ore assets. It also sold its Australian assets.

On March 13, 2020, the company acquired AK Steel Holding for $1.1 billion. In December 2020, the company acquired the United States operations of ArcelorMittal for approximately $1.4 billion, making it the largest producer of flat-rolled steel and iron ore pellets in North America.

In February 2022, Cleveland-Cliffs agreed to pay a $3 million settlement related to Clean Water Act violations, including a cyanide and ammonia spill in August 2019 that killed thousands of fish and closed Lake Michigan beaches. After the settlement, Cleveland-Cliffs stated it would change its water testing and public announcement procedures.

Archives
Cleveland-Cliffs has deposited many of its pre-1981 papers in the Historical Collections of the Great Lakes at Bowling Green State University as well as Central Upper Peninsula Archives at Northern Michigan University.

Carbon footprint
Cleveland-Cliffs reported Total CO2e emissions (Direct + Indirect) for 31 December 2020 at 32,200 Kt.

See also
 Cliffs Shaft Mine Museum
 Iron mining in the United States

References

External links

Mining companies of the United States
Companies based in Cleveland
Steel companies of the United States
Non-renewable resource companies established in 1847
American companies established in 1847
1847 establishments in Ohio
Companies listed on the New York Stock Exchange
Great Lakes Shipping Companies